Odontoptera is a genus of planthoppers in the family Fulgoridae: from Central and South America.

Species
The following species are listed: 
 Odontoptera carrenoi (Signoret, 1849)
 Odontoptera spectabilis (Carreno, 1841), (type species)
 Odontoptera toulgoeti (Bourgoin & O'Brien, 1994)

Gallery

References

External links
 
 
 
 

Fulgorinae